Michel Edmond Alfred Souplet (3 April 1929 – 14 May 2020) was a French politician who served as a Senator.

References

1929 births
2020 deaths
French politicians